Nancy Louise Kyes, known professionally as Nancy Loomis, is an American former actress. A frequent collaborator of filmmaker John Carpenter, she portrayed Annie Brackett in Halloween (1978) and also appeared in his films Assault on Precinct 13 (1976) and The Fog (1980). She reprised her role as Annie in Halloween II (1981) and made her final film appearance as a different character in the stand-alone Halloween III: Season of the Witch (1982).

Early life
 
Kyes was born in Falls Church, Virginia, in the United States.  She attended high school in Riverside, California, and studied theatre at Northwestern University in Evanston, Illinois.

Career
Before starring in Halloween, she played Julie in the 1976 thriller, Assault on Precinct 13, also directed by Carpenter. In addition to acting, she served as the film's wardrobe mistress, but she used a different name for the film credits ("Louise Kyes" for the wardrobe mistress credit and "Nancy Loomis" for her acting credit).

In 1980, Kyes played the role of Sandy Fadel in Carpenter's hit horror film, The Fog, in which she appeared with her Halloween co-star Jamie Lee Curtis, her Assault on Precinct 13 co-star Darwin Joston, and Charles Cyphers, who appeared with Kyes in both Halloween and Assault on Precinct 13.

In 1981, Kyes filmed a new scene to be inserted into the television version of Halloween, and filmed a brief cameo appearance as the now-deceased Annie for Halloween II. Kyes had a small role in Halloween III: Season of the Witch (1982) as the ex-wife of the lead character, played by Tom Atkins. This made her the first person to appear in the first three Halloween films.

Although she has starred in a few TV movies, her only guest appearance on television was on the 1985 revival of The Twilight Zone.

After retiring from acting, she worked as a sculptor in the Los Angeles area along with teaching theatre courses at Cal Poly Pomona.

Personal life
 
Kyes was married to producer, screenwriter and director Tommy Lee Wallace, with whom she has two children. They later divorced.

Filmography

References

External links
 Nancykyes.com - Nancy Kyes's website
 

American film actresses
Living people
People from Falls Church, Virginia
Actresses from Virginia
Northwestern University School of Communication alumni
21st-century American women
Year of birth missing (living people)